Argos Hill may refer to a number of things.

Argos Hill, Mayfield, a hamlet near Mayfield, United Kingdom
Argos Hill Mill, Mayfield, a windmill built thereon
, a British cargo ship in service 1939–45.